Grevillea subtiliflora is species of flowering plant in the family Proteaceae and is endemic to the southwest of Western Australia. It is an open, erect shrub with pinnatisect leaves, the end lobes linear, and clusters of white flowers that are yellowish-green in the bud stage.

Description
The edges of the leaves are rolled under, enclosing the lower surface apart from the midvein.

This grevillea is sometimes confused with G. intricata that has flowers with a glabrous inner surface, and more tangled foliage.

TaxonomyGrevillea subtiliflora was first formally described in 1986 by the botanist Donald McGillivray in his book New Names in Grevillea (Proteaceae) from specimens collected by John Stanley Beard in 1973. The specific epithet (subtiliflora'') means "delicately-flowered".

Distribution and habitat
This grevillea grows in shrubland and is restricted to the Paynes Find area of the Avon Wheatbelt and Yalgoo bioregions of south-western Western Australia.

Conservation status
This grevillea is listed as "Priority Three" by the Government of Western Australia Department of Biodiversity, Conservation and Attractions, meaning that it is poorly known and known from only a few locations but is not under imminent threat.

See also
 List of Grevillea species

References

subtiliflora
Proteales of Australia
Eudicots of Western Australia
Taxa named by Donald McGillivray
Plants described in 1986